Elections to the Dunfermline District Council took place in May 1988, alongside elections to the councils of Scotland's various other districts. The number of seats and the total vote share won by each party is listed below.  

  
 
Other parties and Independents received 6.9% of the vote. Voter turnout was 47.5%.

References

 Fife Council elections
1988 Scottish local elections